Newport is a constituent market town in Telford and Wrekin in Shropshire, England. The 2001 census recorded 10,814 people living in the town's parish, which rose to 11,387 by the 2011 census.

Toponym 
The Normans planned a new town called Novus Burgus roughly on the Anglo-Saxon settlement of Plesc. The first market charter was granted by Henry I, and over time the name changed from Novus Burgus, to Nova Porta, to Newborough and finally to Newport in about 1220.

Location
The site was chosen partly because of its location near the Via Devana (Roman Road, which ran from Colchester to Chester), and partly because of the number of fisheries (which are mentioned in the Domesday Survey). The River Meese, which flows from Aqualate Mere, lies to the north of the town.

Newport sits on a sandstone ridge on the eastern border of the Welsh Marches and west of the Aqualate Mere, the largest natural lake in the English Midlands. The area around it at the end of the last ice age was part of Lake Lapworth. Formed from melting glaciers, it covered a vast area of north Shropshire. There is evidence of pre-historic fishing in the area as two ancient log boats were uncovered  from Newport. One has been preserved and is kept at Harper Adams University at Edgmond.

The villages of Church Aston, Chetwynd and Longford are adjoined to the south of Newport, though they remain in separate parishes. The village of Edgmond is located just to the west, separated by Cheney Hill, Chetwynd Park and the currently truncated Shrewsbury and Newport Canal.

Like many rural market towns, Newport was influenced by industry; it served the needs of the mining area to the east of Shropshire and was also affected by mass-produced industrial goods that replaced traditional crafts.

Newport's inland location can lead to very cold winters. It holds the record for the lowest temperature recorded in England,  on 11 January 1982. This was cold enough to freeze diesel fuel in vehicles.

History

Newport was located in the historic kingdom of Mercia, near where Wreocensæte was once situated. Humans inhabited the surrounding area long before the creation of the town. Once established, Newport became a market town in the centre of the rural farming area between Stafford and Shrewsbury.

Saxon period
In Saxon times, there were two settlements in the area. The first, Eastun, has been identified as Church Aston, and the second was Plaesc which is now Newport. In AD 963, Plaesc was described as having a High Street, a stone quarry, and a religious community. The name Plaesc means a shallow pool. Few signs of the Saxon settlement exist today, apart from the High Street,  the Quarry, which could be either the Quarry on Stafford Road, or the Hole Meadow on Wellington Road. This has not been definitely confirmed.

Norman period
At the time of the Norman Conquest, the land where Newport sits formed part of the manor of Edgmond, which William I gave as a gift along with the county of Shropshire to Roger, Earl of Shrewsbury. Henry I founded the borough, first called Newborough, after the manor came into his hands from Robert de Belesme.

Newport was omitted from the Domesday Book of 1086, but this is not uncommon. Other towns omitted include London, Tamworth, Oswestry and Ludlow, all boroughs since Saxon times.

The Normans planned the new town around the older one during the reign of Henry I. The wide main street was designed for its market, and the narrow burgage plots running at right angles to it are typical of Norman architecture and planning, though today only Newport Guildhall and Smallwood Lodge are clear signs of Tudor buildings, due to the 1665 fire which destroyed most of the High Street.

Medieval Newport flourished with trade in leather, wool and fish. Novoportans possessed the right to provide fish for the Royal table. The many half-timbered buildings surviving from the late medieval and Tudor periods confirm Newport's success, leading to the first market charter which was granted by Henry I.

The town is mentioned once by John Leland in a list of castles, though now no visible remains of the castle exist; however, the most probable location for it would have been the traditional site of a manor house at Upper Bar, where there is a fragment of a square, broad moat, or on the higher ground along the Forton road, where the Castle House school stands. As regards the moat, nearly square, forming by measurement an area of 60 square yards, two sides have been filled with rubbish. Nothing is known about the occupants of the moated site. It could have pre-dated the town or, perhaps more likely, could have been the manor house of the Audleys, who were granted the manor in 1227. By 1421, the manor house was in ruins.

One of the main reasons for Newport's early wealth was the surrounding fisheries and the chief service of the burgesses, being that of taking fish to the Royal court wherever it might be. This custom was continued after Henry III had granted the borough, with the manor of Edgmond, to Henry de Audley; Henry's son James granted in the middle of the 13th century that the burgesses need not take the fish anywhere except within the county of Shropshire.

The burgesses received certain privileges from Henry I; Henry II, in an undated charter, granted them all the liberties, rights and customs that they had enjoyed in the time of Henry I, including a guild merchant, which is mentioned in the quo warranto rolls as one of the privileges claimed by the burgesses. Confirmation charters were granted by Edward I in 1287 and Edward II in 1311, while the town was incorporated in 1551 by Edward VI, whose charter was confirmed by James I in 1604. The governing body consisted of a Lord High Steward, deputy steward, two water-bailiffs and 28 burgesses, but the corporation was abolished by the Municipal Corporation Act of 1883, and a Local Board was formed, which, under the Local Government Act 1894, gave place to an urban district council.

Regency period
In 1665, many buildings were damaged in the Great Fire of Newport, and only a few of the medieval structures remain. However, there remain many fine Regency and Georgian frontages built on the site of the former Norman plots. This allows the main streets of Newport to be wider and less cluttered than those of the other towns of its age.

Edwardian period

By the 19th century, Newport was surrounded by large estates that came right to the verge of the town, determining size and development. The vivary and open fields at Norbroom had gone making the town dependent on its rural hinterland. The few fields that remained were for hay or cattle, forming a small green belt. These estates exerted a powerful influence on the town, something obvious in the deference shown and respect paid to these landed families until at least the First World War.

Beginning in the southwest of the town was the largest estate, the Lilleshall estate of the Duke of Sutherland. This dates from the dissolution of the monasteries, the lands of Lilleshall Abbey being purchased in 1539 by James Leveson of Wolverhampton.

The next estate is that in the south-east of Woodcote Hall, a smaller one belonging to the Cotes family.

On the west between Lilleshall and the town was the Longford Estate of the Talbots, Earls of Shrewsbury, sold in 1789 to Ralph Leake of Wellington who had made his fortune in the East India Company.

North of the town is the Chetwynd Park estate of the Pigotts, bought in 1803 by Thomas Borrow of north Derbyshire who changed his surname to Burton Borough.

The Aqualate Estate to the east lies mostly in Staffordshire.

20th century
The town was fortunate to avoid civilian casualties during the Second World War when on Christmas Eve 1944, a V-1 flying bomb launched from a Heinkel bomber and aimed at Manchester landed in a field east of Newport, about 300 yards from the Newport to Gnosall road. This bomb is now on display at Royal Air Force Museum Cosford.

The passenger service on the railway line between Stafford and Wellington was withdrawn in 1964 as a result of the Beeching Axe, and the line closed completely in 1967. The track was lifted soon afterwards, and the Newport end was subsequently redeveloped for housing.

In the 1960s to early 1970s, when the population of Newport was nearer 3000, over a third of the local workforce was employed at Serck Audco Valves, Greenwood Moore, Kwiz Feather Flights etc.  All of this industry and large-scale employment has since gone - mostly during the late 1970s and early 1980s.

On 23 November 1981, an F1/T2 tornado which formed over the nearby civil parish of Chetwynd later moved over Newport, causing some damage in the town.

At Harper Adams University College just outside Newport in Edgmond, on 11 January 1982 the English lowest temperature weather record was broken (and is kept to this day): .

Modern-day Newport
Newport is now predominantly a commuter town, with people travelling to Telford, Shrewsbury, Stafford, Wolverhampton and beyond for employment.

Previously, very little redevelopment happened in Newport from the 1960s—attention going instead to nearby towns including Wellington and Oakengates, which make up the new town of Telford—until the Telford and Wrekin Council borough towns incentive was brought about in 2007. The town received major investments over the following years, including a major redevelopment of the canal and surrounding area, the lower bar of the High Street area, planned housing, bars and restaurants set to line the canal. New sporting facilities, including a climbing wall in the Springfield's area of the town, were provided.

In the spring of 2010, the first stage of the town's £1.5million regeneration began, with the £250,000 and £300,000 redevelopment of Victoria Park behind the now-defunct The Royal Victoria Hotel. The next stage of the regeneration, which was mainly focused on the High Street area of the town and Central square, involved re-surfacing the High-Street pavements and changing the design of the High Street around the Puleston Cross, removing the cobblestones and replacing them with paving and the traced outline of the 1850s market hall.

In July 2011, Telford and Wrekin Council unveiled plans for green land off the A518 bypass. The proposals included hundreds of new homes, a new supermarket, a business park and improvements to Burton Borough School.

House prices in the town are the highest in the TF postcode area (including the towns of Telford and Market Drayton) and among the highest in the county.

The town is currently attempting to acquire Transition Towns and Fairtrade Town statuses.

Facilities and places of interest

The High Street
The main street in Newport follows the Norman design. This resulted in the distinctive long wide High Street, split into three parts, upper bar, lower bar and St Mary's street, with the centre of the high street being the 19th-century Newport Town and Market Hall completed in March 1860, with an Italianate frontage. This replaced an earlier building that was demolished due to fire.

Burgage plots ran along either side, and the church rising up in the middle, with the High Street with St Mary's Street splitting off and re-joining the high street around the island on which are sited the St Nicholas Church and the Puleston Cross (an ancient memorial cross usually known locally but inaccurately as the Butter Cross).

After the fire of Newport in 1665 the old Norman buildings were replaced with grander Georgian architecture, which hid the work yards behind. The Georgian shops remain, but the work yards have now been developed into housing and the Boughey Gardens tennis courts, next to the literary institute.

Newport has retained shops on High Street, Stafford Street and St Mary's Street, with St Mary's Street having cobblestones and the majority of shops being small boutiques. St Mary's is also the site of various markets and fairs which tie in with Newport's indoor market.

The town also has businesses such as Costa Coffee, Boots, Card Factory, Subway, Greggs, Coral, Bet365, the town's former Woolworths store was developed into a B&M Bargains.

On the Newport by-pass near to the Aqualate Mere the A518 road there is a small out-of-town industrial estate known as Mere Park, featuring a garden centre, hotel and restaurant.  There are also various other small-scale industrial estates that lie around the Newport by-pass and Springfield estate.

Other areas
The oldest man-made landmark in the town is the Puleston Cross which is a butter cross positioned near the Church of St Nicholas. This is a 13th-century cross denoting a marketplace. The cross was set up in memory of Sir Roger de Pyvelesdon (i.e. 'de Puleston') who died in 1272, in Shropshire. This is confirmed in a deed signed by his son Sir Roger de Puleston in 1285, which refers to the cross set up for the soul of Roger de Pyvelesdon who died in 1272.

Towards the top end of the town is the Combat Stress centre, built in 1908 as the infirmary for the Newport Workhouse; it was subsequently developed as accommodation for elderly ladies until its closure in 1995. The home was purchased in 1996 and refurbished.

The town sits near the Aqualate Mere, which is the largest natural lake in the English Midlands.

Religious sites

The first recorded religious community was documented in Saxon script from 963 AD. This was the church of St Mary Magdalene, built in the time of Archbishop Dunstan.

Newport lies in the Church of England Diocese of Lichfield and the Roman Catholic Diocese of Shrewsbury and as a Norman-planned new town, religion played a strong part in the design of the town, with the centre of the town being dominated by St Nicholas Church, originally built in the reign of Henry I and restored in 1886 and 1890.

The second church in the town is the St Peter and Paul Catholic church in Newport Salters Lane, built 1857 and the oldest Catholic church in Shropshire, designed by Augustus Pugin.

They include a Norman west door and part of the front, considerable remains of the church besides, and traces of domestic buildings. The abbey was founded in 1145, under charter from King Stephen, by Richard de Baumes or Belmeis, dean of St Alkmund, Shrewsbury, for Augustinian canons, who were brought from Dorchester Abbey, Oxfordshire.

A smaller church for the Baptist community sits at the back of The Royal Victoria Hotel in water lane, called Newport Baptist church, which was built in the 1960s.

The town has had a wide range of religious sites over time and this is shown in the number of churches in the town, the Independent Chapel, Beaumaris Lane, Newport, built 1803 on the site of a church dating from 1765, converted into cottages in 1832 when they finished work on the new church, the Newport Independent (Congregational) Chapel, Wellington Road, built in 1831, subsequently becoming part of the United Reformed Church. It merged with the Methodist Chapel in Avenue Road in 2001 to become Trinity Church, a joint Methodist/United Reformed Church. A major renovation was undertaken in 2010.

Due to the growth and decline of religions over time some previous churches have since been used for other uses or been demolished altogether, most of these are in the Upper Bar area of the town, around the Granville road and Wellington road area.

Near to the Trinity church is the Newport Primitive Methodist Chapel, built 1877, closed 1920 which replaced the one built in Stafford Road, built 1830. This is still there as a house next door to the New Inn.

Two more former churches are the Newport Wesleyan Methodist Chapel, Upper Bar, built 1829, which was turned into a shop and theatre in 1876 and the Wesleyan Methodist Chapel in Avenue Road which was built in 1876 and closed in 2001 on merging with the Wellington Road URC Chapel; it subsequently became a gym but has since been converted into a house.

Newport General Cemetery was opened for burials on 2 March 1859 with its first interment taking place on 5 March 1859 when it is noted that some 1,000 people witnessed the burial. The cemetery contains a chapel built at the same time and is bounded at the public roadside by fine wrought iron railings and gates. The cemetery was originally laid out with four oval lawns around a cross-shaped set of roads with the chapel centrally placed. Also buried in the cemetery are eleven British Army soldiers of World War I and a soldier and airman of World War II, who are commemorated by a row of Commonwealth War Graves Commission headstones.

Economy

Newport is the main hub for the farming community along the Shropshire/Staffordshire border and as a local business centre. The Football Association, Medical and Exercise Science Department is based at Lilleshall Hall on the outskirts of the town.

A large section of Newport's economy is based around education, two selective state schools and a large comprehensive drawing students from far beyond the town, as well as a university on the edge of the town along with a regional food academy.

Retail plays a major part of the economy of the town, with the majority of shops being located in and around the High street, with larger out-of-town stores located on the Audley Avenue and Springfield trading estates in the south of the town and to the east of the town the Mere park complex.

Culture

Events and venues

Cosy Hall is used for the Newport music festival.

The Newport Guildhall is a medieval timber-framed building which dates back to around 1400.

Town events

The town hosts many events throughout the year, but six main events bring people to Newport. Newport Show is hosted yearly at Chetwynd Deer Park and is the major annual event in the town, first held in Victoria Park in 1890 and now attracting 13,000 visitors each year. The show is now held at Chetwynd Deer Park between Edgmond and Newport.

In the centre of town itself the main events are the Newport Carnival and the Newport Old Tyme Market. The biggest event in the town is the biennial Newport Nocturne Bike Race.

Britain in Bloom
In 2009 Newport became the first town in the country to win six gold awards in a row in the  Britain in Bloom contest. The 2010 competition, wherein it won more points than any town in the United Kingdom  gave Newport its seventh consecutive gold medal.

Media
The town is covered by a local community radio station called NOVA FM, which broadcasts from the high street on 97.5FM, and by regional stations Signal 107.7, (formerly Telford FM), Free Radio, (formerly Beacon Radio), and BBC Radio Shropshire.

The Newport and Market Drayton Advertiser, is the town's weekly newspaper, in publication since 1854, has premises located on St Mary's Street. The town is also covered by the county-wide Shropshire Star and The Shropshire Magazine. All are published by Shropshire Newspapers Ltd.  Nova Magazine, first published in 1994 as Nova News, is a free monthly magazine distributed to Newport, Church Aston, Edgmond, Tibberton, Hinstock, Forton, Sutton, Norbury, Gnosall, Outwoods, Moreton, Sheriffhales, Muxton and Lilleshall.

In the media
Christmas Guisers' Play from Newport, Shropshire [1883] is about the town. Newport was the first town in Shropshire to be on Dickinson's Real Deal. A television documentary called The Spy Who Stole My Life showed the town as the backdrop of the Robert Hendy-Freegard story, who conned students from the town was shown by Channel Five on 7 September 2005. In Australia, this was called The spy Who Conned Me.

Education

Newport has a full range of educational establishments, from primary schools to a university. The selective schools in the town are Newport Girls' High School and Haberdashers' Adams (previously known as Adams' Grammar School). Harper Adams University is located in the nearby village of Edgmond, and Keele University operates teaching rooms in the doctor's surgery for trainee student doctors. For Further Education students, the closest colleges to the town are Telford College of Arts and Technology and Stafford College, with Buses running from the town to both colleges and to Shrewsbury College of Arts & Technology. Just outside the town is Edgmond Hall, used by Sandwell Metropolitan Borough Council for outdoor activities for school students.

Transport
The town has been a well-used crossing point even before the creation of the settlement and sits on a historical crossing of the Via Devana.

The town became prominent as a coaching town on the Mail coach route between London, North Wales and Ireland as well being on a historic junction on the road from London to Chester and the East Midlands. This meant that the town grew around the different roads that cross the town. At the centre of the town is a large island with the church of St. Nicholas at one end and Central Square nightclub at the other, the High Street on one side and St Mary's Street on the other side. The two streets come together at one end in front of the nightclub at the junction with the A518 from Stafford which runs through the town on an east–west route from Stafford to Telford. They come together at the other end by the truncated Shrewsbury and Newport Canal beyond which is the junction with the A519 road from Eccleshall and Stoke-on-Trent. At the southern end of the High Street is another junction where the A519 road leaves on its way to Telford.

Before the road network, the canal was the main link to the town. It is not currently connected to the national network, but there are plans to restore it to a fully working canal by the Shrewsbury and Newport Canals Trust. linking into the national canal network at Norbury Junction to the east of the A41 which now borders the town to the east on a north–south by-pass route opened in early 1985 to ease the congestion on the High Street.

Buses

The town is served by buses between Stafford and Telford and a service from Shrewsbury. Arriva Midlands is the main service provider for the town with additional shoppers services operated by Wrekin Rider, the bus operating arm of Telford and Wrekin District Council.

Rail
The former Stafford to Shrewsbury Line once ran through the town, but due to cuts Newport (Salop) railway station was closed in September 1964 and has now been dismantled. The line has been restored to Hortonwood, and it is possible that the next phase could be to reconnect the town to the railway network. This has been given a boost by the town council, who are currently in talks with Stafford Borough Council to discuss the link to Stafford. The line is in the top 36 'Lines that should reopen' listing published by the Campaign for Better Transport, and with the Telford International Freight Park in Donnington, Telford needing better connections to the east coast and Scotland, this could mean a line going past the town and on towards Gnosall and Stafford.

Cycling
Newport is on National Route 55 and Regional Route 75 of the Sustrans National Cycle Network. Cycle maps for these routes are available from the Newport Visitor Information centre, located in the Pop Up Shop on Wellington Road. The cycleway to Stafford runs on the former railway line and will be completed by the end of 2014.

Walking

Sport and clubs

Newport Town FC play in the West Midlands (Regional) League (Division Two) and have a reserve side ("Edgmond Rangers") who play in the Mercian Regional Football League (Division Two). Newport Town were the league champions of the Shropshire County Premier Football League for the 2011–12 season, earning them promotion. Since promotion in 2012, the senior team now plays its home games at Harper Adams University College in Edgmond and the reserve team also play in Edgmond. Previously they played their home games at Shuker Field, a  field close to the Burton Borough School in Newport itself.

The Newport Crown Green Bowls club plays in the Premier Division of Shropshire after promotion from the Mid Shropshire division one as well as many other division and leagues.

Newport (Salop) Rugby Union Football Club is the highest-ranked rugby club in Shropshire, and the main club in the town  Newport Cricket Club plays in the Shropshire Premier Cricket League Premier Division.

On 2009, the £200,000 Newport Sk8 park was formally opened by Princess Anne. The skatepark is the largest in Shropshire and the largest W/ramp in Britain.

265(Chetwynd) Air Training Corps are also based just outside of Newport, on the Chetwynd Deer Park.

Lilleshall Sports Centre

Lilleshall Hall - formerly the country retreat and hunting lodge for the Duke of Sutherland, situated just  from the centre of Newport and is now home to Lilleshall National Sports Centre.

Notable residents

Early times 

 Robert Puleston, (born in Newport) – brother-in-law and supporter of Owain Glyndŵr, against King Henry IV
 Richard Barnfield (1574 in Norbury, Staffordshire – 1620) – English poet, obscure though close relationship with William Shakespeare, brought up in Edgmond nearby.
 William Adams, (1585 in Newport – 1661) – London Haberdasher founded Haberdashers' Adams in 1656
 Thomas Brown (1662 in Newport or Shifnal – 1704) – satirist

1750–1900 

 John Meeson Parsons (1798 in Newport – 1870) – art collector and director of the Shropshire Union Railway
 William Ick (1800 in Newport – 1844) English botanist and geologist
 James Brown (1812–1881) – Roman Catholic Bishop of Shrewsbury from 1851 to 1881, lived Salter's Hall, near Newport 
 Arabella Elizabeth Roupell (1817 in Newport – 1914) – English flower painter
 James Hain Friswell (1825 in Newport – 1878) – English essayist and novelist
Thomas Collins (1841 – 1934 in Newport) – played first-class cricket for Cambridge University from 1861 and 1863 and was headmaster of Newport Grammar School from 1871 to in 1903
 Charles Cecil Cotes (1846 Woodcote Hall – 1898) – British landowner and Liberal politician
 Colonel the Rt. Hon. William Slaney Kenyon-Slaney (1847–1908) – sportsman, soldier and MP for Newport 1886 to 1908
 Percy John Heawood (1861 in Newport – 1955) – British mathematician 
 James Edward Quibell, (1867 in Newport – 1935) – Egyptologist
 Frederick Phillips Raynham (1893–1954) – office worker at Harper Adams College and pilot from the early days of aviation

From 1900 

 Sir Peter James Bottomley (born 1944 in Newport) – British Conservative MP for Worthing West since 1997
 Ozzy Osbourne (born 1948) - Heavy metal rock singer, owned a bar in St Mary's Street in the late 1970s, run by his then wife Thelma, before selling it two years later. After a closure in 2013 it was revived under name of Ozzy's Sports Bar in his honour.
 Jeremy Corbyn, (born 1949) – Labour MP for Islington North since 1983, Leader of the Labour Party from 2015 to 2020. Lived as child in Pave Lane and attended Castle House School and Haberdashers' Adams
 Peter Butler (born 1951 in Newport) – British Conservative MP for North East Milton Keynes from 1992 to 1997
 M. J. Bassett (born c. 1965 in Newport) – is an English screenwriter and film director of Solomon Kane
 Robert Hendy-Freegard, (born 1971) – barman in Newport, conman, impostor who masqueraded as an MI5 agent
 Craig Phillips, (born 1971) – winner of Big Brother 2000 lived in Newport
 Stuart Meeson (born 1972 in Newport) – physicist in Electrical Impedance Tomography, went to school in Newport
 James Sutton (born 1983) – is an English actor, best known for playing John Paul McQueen in Hollyoaks. Lived in Newport

Sport
 Herbert Denis Edleston Elliott (1887 in Newport – 1973) – English cricketer, played for Essex County Cricket Club
 Reuben (Ben) Jones (1932 in Newport – 1990) – an Olympic equestrian, competed in the 1964 Summer Olympics
 Paul Bracewell, (born 1962) – footballer for England, Newcastle United and Sunderland 
 Adam Proudlock, (born 1981) – youth team coach for Newport Town, played for Wolves, Ipswich Town and Nottingham Forest
 David Pallett (born 1990) – English darts player for Professional Darts Corporation lives in Newport
 Callum Burton (born 1996 in Newport) – English football goalkeeper for Shrewsbury Town F.C.
 Ben Rowlings (born 1996) – British Paralympic athlete who competes in the T34 classification, lives in Newport

Surrounding villages and hamlets

The town is surrounded by many different small villages, ranging from the larger settlements of Edgmond and Lilleshall to smaller hamlets all of which are joined to the town or separated only by a small distance.  Most of these settlements are seen as parts of the town's catchment zone.  Due to Newport's proximity to the county border, a number include Newport in their postal address, despite being situated in Staffordshire.

The following villages and settlements can be found near Newport:

 Church Aston
 Chetwynd
 Longford
 Edgmond
 Moreton, Staffordshire
 Meretown
 Adeney
 Stockton, Shropshire
 Pave Lane
 Bromstead Heath (Staffordshire)
 Great Chatwell (Staffordshire)
 Forton, (Staffordshire)
 Coley (Staffordshire)
 Outwoods (Staffordshire)
 Wilbrighton (Staffordshire)
 Tibberton

Closest cities, towns and villages

See also
Listed buildings in Newport, Shropshire
Shropshire Star Newport Nocturne
Shrewsbury and Newport Canal
Newport Show
Newport (Shropshire) (UK Parliament constituency)

References

Bibliography

External links

 Newport Town Council
 Newport Shropshire online information portal

 
Market towns in Shropshire
Civil parishes in Shropshire
Telford and Wrekin
Tourist attractions in Shropshire
Populated places established in the 12th century
Towns in Shropshire